The UEFA Europa League is the second most important club competition in Europe organized by UEFA. Originally a knock-out competition, it later evolved and included group stages and a series of qualifying rounds. It was known as the UEFA Cup from its beginning, in 1971, until 2009. This competition has been dominated by great players in the history of football who have scored many goals that helped their clubs to win the competition. This article includes season top scorers, overall top scorers, and club top scorers.

All-time top scorers (group stage to final)

Bold = Still active

All-time top scorers (including qualifying rounds)

Bold = Still active

Top scorers by season

The top scorer award is for the player who amassed the most goals in the tournament (tournament phase differs from qualification phase).

By club

 * Two or more players were equal top scorers.
 ** A top scorer played for two different clubs during given season.
 List is ordered by date of accomplishment.

By country

 * Two or more players were equal top scorers.
  List is ordered by date of accomplishment.

By player

 * Two or more players were equal top scorers.
  List is ordered by date of accomplishment.

Notes

References

top
top
UEFA Cup
UEFA Cup